Lorde (born 1996) is a New Zealand singer-songwriter. She released her debut EP, The Love Club, and her debut studio album, Pure Heroine, in 2013. Lorde won a New Zealand Music Award for the former in 2013 and a Taite Music Prize for the latter in 2014. Her debut single "Royals" earned multiple awards and nominations from 2013 to 2014, including one APRA Award, one Billboard Music Award and one MTV Video Music Award. The single won in two categories: Song of the Year and Best Pop Solo Performance at the 2014 Grammy Awards. At age 17, Lorde is the youngest artist to ever win a Grammy Award for Song of the Year.

Lorde contributed four songs to the soundtrack for The Hunger Games: Mockingjay, Part 1, including the single "Yellow Flicker Beat". With the latter track, the singer earned nominations for Best Original Song at the Golden Globe Awards and Best Song at the Critics' Choice Awards in 2015. Her second album Melodrama, released in 2017, won a New Zealand Music Award and earned a nomination for Album of the Year at the 2018 Grammy Awards ceremony. Overall, she has received 42 awards and 86 nominations .

Awards and nominations

Notes

References

Lorde
Lorde
Lorde, awards